Graham Hobson was an American college football coach. He served as the head football coach at Richmond College—now known as the University of Richmond—in Richmond, Virginia, for one season, in 1902, compiling a record of 3–3.

Head coaching record

References

Year of birth missing
Year of death missing
Richmond Spiders football coaches
University of Virginia alumni